Papilio jordani, the Jordan's swallowtail, is a vulnerable species of butterfly in the family Papilionidae. It is endemic to northern Sulawesi in Indonesia.

Taxonomy
Papilio jordani is a member of the fuscus species group. The members of this clade are:
 Papilio albinus Wallace, 1865
 Papilio diophantus Grose-Smith, 1883
 Papilio fuscus Goeze, 1779 
 Papilio hipponous C. & R. Felder, 1862
 Papilio jordani Fruhstorfer, 1906
 Papilio pitmani Elwes & de Nicéville, [1887]
 Papilio prexaspes C. & R. Felder, 1865
 Papilio sakontala Hewitson, 1864

Etymology
It was named to honour German entomologist Karl Jordan.

References

External links
The Global Butterfly Information System Images of male syntype deposited in the Natural History Museum, London. Taxonomic history.

jordani
Butterflies of Indonesia
Endemic fauna of Indonesia
Fauna of Sulawesi
Butterflies described in 1902
Taxonomy articles created by Polbot